Bob Freeman is a Democratic member of the Tennessee House of Representatives representing the 56th District, a part of Davidson County.

Personal history 
Bob Freeman was born on July 3, 1975 as the oldest of three children to Bill Freeman. His father, a 2015 candidate for Nashville mayor, is a real estate executive, Tennessee Democratic donor, and the CEO and co-founder of Freeman Webb Co. Freeman earned his B.S. from Middle Tennessee State University, and graduated from Lipscomb University with an M.S. before pursuing a career in real estate. He served as vice president for real estate investment and development with the Forestar Group, Inc. before he co-founded the energy consulting and sustainable construction firm Freeman Applegate Partners in 2013. Freeman is married, has three children, and is a Presbyterian.

Campaign for the Tennessee House of Representatives 56th District Seat 
Freeman reported his decision to run for the house seat for the 56th District after the incumbent Republican Beth Harwell announced that she would seek the GOP nomination for the 2018 Tennessee gubernatorial election. He began his campaign as the only Democratic candidate for the seat in November, 2017, competing for the affluent Nashville district with the dermatologist Dr. Brent Moody, who won the Republican primaries against the lawyer Joseph Williams with 55.5 percent of the vote. During his campaign, Freeman cited education, traffic congestion, infrastructure, and the opioid crises as the state's primary concerns, and stressed the necessity of bipartisanship in his public appearances. Freeman won the race for the 56th district with 51.4 percent of the vote; his seat became one of two that Democrats flipped in the 2018 elections.

Political activity as member of the 111th General Assembly 
As a member of the 111th General Assembly, Freeman is serving on the following committees:

 Committee of Consumer and Human Resources;
 the Employee Affairs Subcommittee;
 the Health Committee;
 the Facilities, Licensure, and Regulations Subcommittee;
 the Elect Ethics Committee;
 and the Workplace Discrimination and Harassment Subcommittee.

He has sponsored or co-sponsored fourteen bills, and voted in favor of policies to increase funding for dual enrollment programs, extend vocational training to the middle school level, and reinforce accountability of charter schools. In addition to his political functions, Freeman is also involved in the following community organizations:

 TN Environmental Council, a private environmental conservation advocacy and umbrella organization, board member;
 Southern Alliance for Clean Energy, board member;
 U.S. Green Building Council's Market Leadership Advisory Boards, a private, non-profit sustainable construction activist organization, board member;
 Nashville Homeless Commission, member;
 Tennessee Wildlife Federation, a non-profit wildlife conservation agency that also monitors and recommends conservation policies, former board member.

References 

Democratic Party members of the Tennessee House of Representatives
Living people
1975 births
Middle Tennessee State University alumni
21st-century American politicians
People from Davidson County, Tennessee